Group Managem is a Moroccan company that is active in the mining industry. It started operating since 1930 in the extraction of metals, precious metals, cobalt and other minerals in Morocco and throughout Africa. Accused of overexploiting water and pollution, the company is also at the heart of an ongoing standoff with the villagers of Imider, who have been occupying a water pipeline to one of the company's most fruitful silver mines, the Societé Metallurgique de Imiter (SMI).

External links 
 Official website of Group Managem

References 

Société Nationale d'Investissement
ONA Group
Mining in Morocco
Mining companies of Morocco
1996 establishments in Morocco